Rebecca D. Jackson is a medical researcher, medical practitioner and professor of endocrinology, diabetes and metabolism. Her research has been significant in the understanding and treatment of osteoporosis. She also researches the opioid crisis in Ohio.

Jackson is director of the Center for Women's Health, the founding director of the Ohio State University Center for Clinical and Translational Science, associate dean for Clinical and Translational Research, and professor of Endocrinology, Diabetes, and Metabolism at the Ohio State University. In 2008, she was elected as a Fellow of the American Association for the Advancement of Science and received the OSU Distinguished Scholar Award, one of Ohio State University's highest research honors, in 2015.

Education 
Jackson received her medical degree from Ohio State University College of Medicine in 1978.

Career 
Jackson was involved in one of the first studies to show that weight lifting, rather than walking, is more beneficial for maintaining bone density: that the ideal exercise to stimulate bone formation is force rather than repetition. She and her colleagues have also been involved in one of the landmark studies examining bisphosphonates, a new class of medications for treating postmenopausal osteoporosis. She has co-authored hundreds of articles that have appeared in publications including American Journal of Preventive Medicine, Arthritis & Rheumatology, Nature, and Nature Communications.

Jackson's research is concentrated in the area of women's health, with a specific focus on defining clinical factors, biomarkers, and genetic associations for diseases that disproportionately affect women (particularly osteoporosis). Her laboratory has had continuous NIH funding for almost 30 years and she has authored or co-authored more than 250 peer-reviewed manuscripts, including the landmark Women's Health Initiative (WHI) Calcium Plus Vitamin D Trial. She was the vice-chair of the WHI, and is now the principal investigator for the WHI Midwest Regional Field Center. Her work focuses on the epidemiology of chronic disease in women, including cancer, osteoporosis, cardiovascular disease and osteoarthritis.

In 2019, Jackson became the lead investigator on a $65 million research study to help reduce deaths from opioid use.

Jackson spends about thirty percent of her time as a clinician and seventy percent as a researcher. She currently practices at the Center for Women's Health in Columbus, Ohio.

Injury 
Jackson had a spinal cord injury in the late 1970s and has used a wheelchair since then.

Notable achievements 
Jackson's work in the field of medicine has resulted in a number of awards and honors:

 1978, American Medical Women's Association Award for Academic Excellence
 1988, Disabled Professional Woman of the Year Award, Pilot Club
 1998, elected to Ohio Women's Hall of Fame
 2003, profiled in "200 Women, 200 Years: Ohio Women of the Year"
 2008, elected as a Fellow of the American Association for the Advancement of Science
 2015, OSU Distinguished Scholar Award, one of Ohio State University's highest research honors
2017, Best Doctor in America
YWCA Woman of Achievement

References

American endocrinologists
Women endocrinologists
American diabetologists
Ohio State University faculty
Ohio State University College of Medicine alumni
Scientists from Ohio
American people with disabilities
Fellows of the American Association for the Advancement of Science
1955 births
Living people
Scientists with disabilities
Opioids in the United States
American women scientists
American women academics
21st-century American women